This is a list of notable people who graduated and/or attended Stephen F. Austin State University in Nacogdoches, Texas.
 Bruce Alexander, former NFL defensive back
 Cliff Ammons (M.S., education), Louisiana state representative known as "the father of Toledo Bend Reservoir"
 Leo Araguz, former NFL punter
Larry Bagley (Master of Education), member of the Louisiana House of Representatives for District 7, beginning 2016
 Derrick Blaylock, former NFL running back (Kansas City Chiefs and New York Jets)
 Roy Blake Jr, former Texas State Representative
 Chrystelle Trump Bond, dancer, choreographer, author, and dance historian
 Kim Brimer, former Texas state senator, District 10
 Robert Campbell (artist), a painter, poet, and publisher
 Shane Carruth, filmmaker; writer, director, producer, and star of Primer
 Larry Centers, former NFL fullback
 Wayne Christian, statewide elected official - Texas Railroad Commissioner (2017–Present) member of Texas House of Representatives (1997–2013); Former President of Texas Conservative Coalition
 Gerald Clarke, artist and educator
 Nelson Clyde, III, late publisher of the Tyler Morning Telegraph
 David Cook, Republican member of the Texas House of Representatives and former mayor of Mansfield, Texas.
 Bobby Cross, former NFL offensive tackle
 Rodney Crowell, songwriter, Nashville producer, singer, writer
 Nancy Dickey, President of the Texas A&M Health Science Center
 Floyd Dixon, former NFL wide receiver
Hunter Dozier, Major League Baseball Player
 Spike Dykes, former head football coach for the Texas Tech Red Raiders
 Dustin Ellermann, competitive shooter; Christian camp director; winner of Top Shot (season 3)
 Lee Fitzgerald, Professor of Zoology and Faculty Curator of Amphibians and Reptiles at Texas A&M University
 Todd Fowler, former NFL and USFL running back/tight end (Houston Gamblers and Dallas Cowboys)
John Franklin-Myers, NFL defensive end for the New York Jets.
 Don Gaston, former Executive Vice President of Gulf and Western Industries; Chairman of the Boston Celtics
 Bill Haley, Texas politician
 Todd Hammel, Arena Football League quarterback for 14 years
 Kevin Hannan, ethnolinguist
 Don Henley, musician, singer, songwriter, and drummer for the Eagles (1971–1980, 1994–present)
 Sam Hunt, former NFL linebacker
 Jason Isaac (Class of 1996), member of the Texas House of Representatives since 2011, from Hays County
 Will Jennings, Grammy (1982, 1986, 1993, and 1997), Golden Globe (1983, 1991, and 1997), and Academy Award-winning (1983 and 1997) songwriter; member of Songwriters Hall of Fame
 Derek Wayne Johnson, award-winning film director, screenwriter and film producer
 Kent Johnston, NFL assistant coach
 Joseph W. Kennedy, co-discoverer of plutonium
 Kelly Krauskopf, former president and general manager of Indiana Fever; assistant general manager of Indiana Pacers
 Ronnie Laws, musician, member of Earth, Wind, and Fire
 Bud Marshall, former NFL defensive lineman
 Donnie Marshall (1969), former DEA Administrator
 Brad Maule, Daytime Emmy Award-winning actor
 Robert Sidney Maxwell  historian, author
 Joe McComb, mayor of Corpus Christi, Texas
 Frank Melton, former mayor of Jackson, Mississippi (1949–2009)
 Peggy Moreland, American writer
 Mark Moseley, 1982 NFL MVP; played for Eagles (1970), Oilers (1971–1972), Redskins (1974–1986), and Browns (1986)
 Drew Nixon, former Republican state senator from Carthage
 Bill Owens, former Republican governor of Colorado
 Stephen Payne, international relations and energy expert
 Bum Phillips, former NFL head coach
 Mike Quinn, NFL quarterback
 Rhonda Rajsich, women's racquetball player and two-time world champion
 Mikhael Ricks, former NFL tight end/wide receiver
 Michael H. Schneider, Judge, U. S. District Court, Eastern District of Texas
 Terrance Shaw, retired NFL defensive back (1995–2004); won Super Bowl XXXVI with the New England Patriots
 James Silas, American Basketball Association and National Basketball Association
 Commander Robert (Bob) A. Smith, retired Navy One of the charter members of SFA's Phi Delta Theta (1940-2020)
 Chad Stanley, former NFL punter, tied NFL record for most punts in a season (114)
 Jeremiah Trotter, former NFL middle linebacker (Philadelphia Eagles)
 LTG (Retired) Orren "Cotton" Whiddon (1955), highest ranking alumni military officer, SFA Alumni Hall of Fame; namesake of "Ol' Cotton"
 David Whitmore, former NFL safety
 Tedd L. Mitchell, Chancellor of the Texas Tech University System

References

External links
http://www.sfaalumni.com/?page=notable

Stephen F. Austin State University